The year 2013 was the fifth year in the history of BRACE, a mixed martial arts promotion based in Australia. In 2013 BRACE held 7 events.

Events list

BRACE 25

BRACE 25 was an event held on December 21, 2013, at North Sydney Leagues Club in Sydney, Australia.

Results

BRACE 24

BRACE 24 was an event held on November 29, 2013, at AIS Arena
in Canberra, Australia.

Results

BRACE 23

BRACE 23 was an event held on October 26, 2013, at Townsville Entertainment Centre in Townsville, Australia.

Results

BRACE 22

BRACE 22 was an event held on September 21, 2013, at Norths LeaguesLeagues in Sydney, Australia.

Results

BRACE 21

BRACE 21 was an event held on July 20, 2013, at North Sydney Leagues Club in Sydney, Australia.

Results

BRACE 20

BRACE 20 was an event held on May 25, 2013, at Broncos Leagues in Brisbane, Australia.

Results

BRACE 19

BRACE 19 was an event held on February 16, 2013, at Big Top Luna Park
in Sydney, Australia.

Results

References 

2013 in mixed martial arts
2013 in Australian sport
BRACE (mixed martial arts) events